The Hawar Islands (transliterated: Juzur Ḥawār) are an archipelago of desert islands; all but one are owned by Bahrain, while the southern, small, and uninhabited Jinan Island (Arabic: جزيرة جينان; transliterated: Jazirat Jinan) is administered by Qatar as part of its Al-Shahaniya municipality. The archipelago is situated off the west coast of Qatar in the Gulf of Bahrain of the Persian Gulf.

Description

The islands used to be one of the settlements of the Bahraini branch of the Dawasir who settled there in the early 19th century. The islands were first surveyed in 1820, when they were called the Warden's Islands, and two villages were recorded.  They are now uninhabited, other than a police garrison and a hotel on the main island; access to all but Hawar island itself is severely restricted.  Local fishermen are allowed to fish in adjacent waters and there is some recreational fishing and tourism on and around the islands. Fresh water has always been scarce; historically it was obtained by surface collection and even today, with the desalination plant, additional supplies have to be brought in.

Geography
The islands were formerly coincident with the district or Minṭaqat Juzur Ḥawār (مِنْطَقَة جُزُر حَوَار) and are now administered as part of the Southern Governorate of Bahrain. The land area of the islands is approximately 52 km2 (20 sq. mi.).

Although there are 36 islands in the group, many of the smaller islands are little more than sand or shingle accumulations on areas of exposed bedrock molded by the ongoing processes of sedimentation and accretion.
The World Heritage Site application named 8 major islands (see table hereafter), which conforms to the description of the islands when first surveyed as consisting of 8 or 9 islands. 
It has often been described as an archipelago of 16 islands. Janan Island, to the south of Hawar island, is not legally considered to be a part of the group and is owned by Qatar.

Separatist movement

Hawari separatists have a representative in France, who advocates the creation of an independent Emirate of Hawar islands. The source, however, does not say what real support the separatist movement has in Hawar Islands.
The flag of the separatist movement was seen in Paris on 1 May 2002. The flag is a dark red rectangle with a white triangle at hoist. The triangle is separated from the red field by a green border, and there are two thin green stripes in the upper and lower parts of the flag. A 14-ray yellow sun outlined in brown is placed inside the white triangle.
Dark red stands for the national pride and the fatherland, green for spring, and white for purity.

Flora and fauna
The islands are home to many bird species, notably Socotra cormorants. There are small herds of Arabian oryx and sand gazelle on Hawar island, and the seas around support a large population of dugong.

Conservation
The islands were listed as a Ramsar site in 1997. In 2002, the Bahraini government applied to have the islands recognised as a World Heritage Site due to their unique environment and habitat for endangered species; the application was ultimately unsuccessful.

Administration
The islands were formerly coincident with the region or Minṭaqat Juzur Ḥawār (مِنْطَقَة جُزُر حَوَار) and are now administered as part of the Southern Governorate of Bahrain.

Jinan Island is administered as part of Al-Shahaniya Municipality of Qatar.

Tourism
The islands' ecology draws numerous birds, oryx, gazelles, and Socotra cormorants. The islands are connected through a short 25 km ferry ride from Manama and are reported to have a potential to be developed as a beach tourism destination.

List of islands

Hawar archipelago 

By far the largest island is Hawar, which accounts for more than 41 km2 (15 sq. mi.) of the 54.5 km2 (21 sq. mi.) land area. Following in size are Suwād al Janūbīyah, Suwād ash Shamālīyah, Rubud Al Sharqiyah, Rubud Al Gharbiyah, and Muhazwarah (Umm Hazwarah).

The following were not considered as part of the Hawar islands in the International Court of Justice (ICJ) judgment, being located between Hawar and the Bahrain Islands and not disputed by Qatar, but have been included in the Hawar archipelago by the Bahrain government as part of the 2002 World Heritage Site application.

Janan Island 

Janan (or Jinan) Island, a small island south of Hawar island, was also considered in the 2001  judgment. Based on a previous agreement when both Qatar and Bahrain were under British protection, it was judged to be separate from the Hawar islands and so considered by the court separately. It was awarded to Qatar.

References

External links 

 Decision of the International Court of Justice on the Hawar dispute (2001)

Maps 
 Basic map with island names and features, p. 3
 Topographical map 
 Geological map
 Navigation chart, Bahrain & Hawar 
 Aerial photograph

Media 
 Bahrain Desert Birds, BBC Planet Earth.  Taken from "Shallow Seas" (2006).

Populated places in Bahrain
Islands of Bahrain
Islands of Qatar
Former municipalities (regions) of Bahrain
Foreign relations of Bahrain
Disputed territories in the Persian Gulf
Disputed islands
Archipelagoes of Asia
Archipelagoes of the Indian Ocean
Territorial disputes of Bahrain
Territorial disputes of Qatar
Bahrain–Qatar border
Ramsar sites in Bahrain
Islands of the Persian Gulf